is the third solo single by former AKB48 headliner Atsuko Maeda; it was released in Japan on September 18, 2013. It is the first single she has released since she formally left AKB48. She first performed the song at an AKB48 concert in Sapporo Dome where she made a special guest appearance.

Promotion
Maeda first performed the song at an AKB48 concert on July 31 at the Sapporo Dome where she made a special guest appearance. On August 15, Maeda released a promotional video for the single.

Maeda spent a week in New York City for the filming of the single's music video as well as posing for the jacket covers for the four different editions (Type-A to Type-D). The Type-A and Type-D jacket covers have Maeda at an old diner where she holds a tall shake or eyes a giant hamburger.  The Type-B jacket was taken at Times Square. The Type-C jacket has her on a bicycle and was taken at Brooklyn Heights.

A promotion was held at Shibuya Tatsuya where over-the-counter purchasers of the single would receive a lottery ticket for a chance at an autographed poster. That same week, Maeda appeared on NHK shows Hemp 1, I dreamed Shi Asaki and Music Japan; and NTV's Music Dragon.

Tie-in 
"Time Machine Nante Iranai" was selected to be the theme song for the live-action adaptation of Yamada-kun and the Seven Witches. Maeda described the song as "cheerful and fun" and hopes it will liven up the show.

Track listings

Type-A

Type-B

Type-C

Type-D

Charts
"Time Machine Nante Iranai" debuted at number two on the Oricon Daily charts, behind Exile's hit, "EXILE PRIDE ~Konna Sekai wo Aisuru Tame~ (こんな世界を愛するため)". It would later peak at number one on the daily, and number two on the weekly chart. On Billboards Japan Hot 100 chart, it debuted at number one.

Billboard charts

Oricon charts

G-music (Taiwan)

Release history

Notes

References 
 Releases

 Other references

External links 
 

2013 singles
Songs with lyrics by Yasushi Akimoto
King Records (Japan) singles
Billboard Japan Hot 100 number-one singles
2013 songs